Vasily Nikolayevich Dyakonov (July 25, 1946 – September 5, 2012) was a Governor of Krasnodar Krai who held this post in 1991–1992. He was succeeded by Nikolai Yegorov.

References

1946 births
2012 deaths
People from Korenovsky District
Governors of Krasnodar Krai